Tornodoxa is a genus of moth in the family Gelechiidae. It was discovered by Kyu-Tek Park in the year 1993. Tornodoxa is found in Korea and Japan. The wingspan of a full grown Tornodoxa is 17-18 mm. Their forewings are ochreas and are sprinkled with grey.

Species
Tornodoxa dubicanella Ueda, 2012
Tornodoxa leptopalta (Meyrick, 1934)
Tornodoxa longiella Park, 1993
Tornodoxa paraleptopalta Ueda, 2012
Tornodoxa tholochorda Meyrick, 1921

References

Chelariini